The Fugates, a family living in the hills of Kentucky starting in the 19th century, were commonly known  as the "Blue Fugates" or the "Blue People of Kentucky". They are known for being carriers of a genetic trait that led to the blood disorder methemoglobinemia, causing the skin to appear blue.

Ancestry 

Martin Fugate and Elizabeth Smith, who had married and settled near Hazard, Kentucky in around 1820, were both carriers of the recessive methemoglobinemia (met-H) gene. As a result, four of their seven children exhibited blue skin, and continued reproduction within the limited local gene pool ensured that many descendants of the Fugates were born with met-H.

The disorder can cause heart abnormalities and seizures if the amount of methemoglobin in the blood exceeds 20 percent, but at levels between 10 and 20 percent it can cause blue skin without other symptoms. Most of the Fugates lived long and healthy lives. The "bluest" of the blue Fugates, Luna Stacy, had 13 children and lived to age 84.

Descendants with the gene continued to live near Troublesome Creek and Ball Creek into the 20th century. They eventually came to the attention of the hematologist Madison Cawein III, who with the assistance of the nurse Ruth Pendergrass made a detailed study of their condition and ancestry. Based on a report published in the Journal of Clinical Investigation in 1960 by a public health physician named E. M. Scott, who had studied a similar phenomenon among native Alaskans, Cawain concluded that a deficiency of the enzyme diaphorase resulted in an oxygen deficiency in the red blood cells, causing the blood to appear brown, which in turn made the skin of those affected appear blue. He treated the family with methylene blue, which eased their symptoms and reduced the blue coloring of their skin. His findings were published in the Archives of Internal Medicine in 1964.

Benjamin Stacy, born in 1975, was the last known descendant of the Fugates to have been born exhibiting the characteristic blue color of the disorder, though he quickly lost his blue skin tone, exhibiting only blue tinges on his lips and fingertips when he became cold or agitated.

In popular culture 
In 2019, the novel The Book Woman of Troublesome Creek, by Kim Michele Richardson, described a fictional version of the Fugate family during the Great Depression.

In 2021, the novel Blue-Skinned Gods by S. J. Sindu references a family from Kentucky with methemoglobinemia but does not use the surname Fugate.

A reference to "the Huntsville subgroup" is made in the American version of television sitcom Shameless when Kevin Ball (played by Steve Howey) discovers that he may have ancestors from that group.

See also
 Family aggregation

References 

Families from Kentucky
Blood disorders